Arky Michael is an Australian actor and writer, who is best known for his role as Fulvio Frangellomini in the television drama series Rafferty's Rules.

Arky also had a starring role in the television series Sweet and Sour and many guest roles on television series such as A Country Practice, Wildside, Water Rats, Grass Roots, Mother and Son and All Saints. He was also featured in the Australian children's series Johnson and Friends, as the costume actor for the titular character in the second series.

He received the Best Actor award at Tropfest in 2005 for the short film Australian Summer. In 2010, he was nominated for a Helpmann Award for Best Male Actor in a Supporting Role in a Play for Belvoir's production of Love Me Tender.

References

External links

Australian male film actors
Australian male soap opera actors
Living people
Male actors from Sydney
Australian people of Greek descent
Year of birth missing (living people)